Hottentots-Holland High School is an Afrikaans- and English-speaking school in the Western Cape in South Africa, situated between the towns of Somerset West and Strand. The parallel-medium, co-educational school, situated to the northeast of the N2 national road, was opened at its current site by Dr G. G. (Gawie) Cillie, Chairman of the School Board, in February, 1930. A portion of the land on which it now stands having been given by Mesdames Beynon and Osler, daughters of an early Somerset West shopkeeper and property owner. At this time the school had an enrollment of 220 pupils and a staff of 11 under Mr A. J. Ackerman. The school motto "Sibi Fidelis Ipsi" is Latin for "True To Oneself".  Prior to 1930, the school operated under the name Somerset West Public School.

As of 2013, it has 1,232 students and 52 teachers. It has students registered in grades 8 through 12.

The school enjoys a strong sporting rivalry with its neighbour high schools, Hoërskool Strand and Parel Vallei High School.

The school is a site for students in the Scientific and Industrial Leadership Initiative (SAILI), a non-profit programme for promising science and engineering pupils which was set up in 2002 by the heads of the four universities in the province after they became frustrated at the low skills levels of first-year students.

SAILI identifies students in low-income families in the second-last year of primary schooling and provides catch-up and reinforcement classes, after which they can enter good quality high schools such as Hottentots Holland. They continue to take classes every two Saturdays at venues such as the MTN Sciencentre for the first two years of high school, after which they take booster lessons at the Cape Peninsula University of Technology.

Notable alumni

Trevor Immelman, professional golfer and winner of the 2008 Masters Tournament 
Jo-Ann Strauss, TV presenter, model, public speaker and businesswoman and Miss South Africa 2000
Deon Lotter, SA rugby Springbok - 1993
Ballie Wahl, SA rugby Springbok - 1949
Eddie Stuart, SA soccer Springbok - 1924
Harry Morkel, SA rugby Springbok - 1921
Theo Pienaar, SA rugby Springbok (Captain) - 1921
Phil Mostert, SA rugby Springbok - 1921, 1924, 1928 and 1931
Jacky Morkel, SA rugby Springbok - 1912
Boy Morkel, SA rugby Springbok - 1910, 1912 and 1921

Coat of arms
The school's coat of arms, based on that of Simon van der Stel, was registered in the name of the Old Students' Union with the Department of the Interior in April 1937.  The registered description is : ''A shield bordered maroon and divided horizontally into two sections; in the top section on a black background a representation of a lamp in silver and in the lower section on an old gold background representations of three castles in maroon  placed equidistant two above and one below, with the inscription  O.S.U. and the motto  SIBI FIDELIS IPSI.  The "castles" are actually towers.

References

External links
Further information:  (note: this is not the official website)

Schools in the Western Cape
Educational institutions established in 1930
1930 establishments in South Africa
Bilingual schools in South Africa
High schools in South Africa